Holothuria (Microthele) fuscogilva, also known as the white teatfish or white teeth, is a species of sea cucumber in the genus Holothuria, subgenus Microthele. The cucumber is found in the tropical waters of the Indo-Pacific ocean. The species is vulnerable to over-exploitation from commercial fishing. It was first formally named by Gustave Cherbonnier in 1980.

Distribution and habitat
Holothuria fuscogilva are found in the Indo-Pacific ocean in shallow waters near islands and around coral reefs. Juvenile cucumbers live in shallower waters (such as inter-tidal zones) and then migrate to deeper waters as they mature. Spawning occurs during the Northeastern Monsoon season (October to December), and the species reaches sexually maturity relatively late.

Description
Adult cucumbers weigh between 2.4 and 4 kilograms. They are oval in shape and have a firm texture. This species cucumber has lateral papillae (teats) which are often buried in the sand.

Use 
Holothuria fuscogilva is consumed as a food and is of large commercial value across its range. The cucumber can be collected by hand using a diving suit or while skin diving, allowing for it to be easily harvested.

Vulnerability and conservation 
Due to overfishing, the cucumber was listed as vulnerable on the IUCN Red List in 2010.

A large population of the cucumber formerly existed in Sri Lanka, but decades of overfishing and mismanagement caused a large decline in the species' numbers. Sri Lanka banned the harvesting of the species in 2019.

References

Holothuriidae
Sea cucumbers as food